"Give Me Your Heart" was a 1975 single by Bloodstone, from their LP, "Do You Wanna Do A Thing". The track made the R&B Top 20. The single was the last track released from their time recording with producer Mike Vernon,  which started three years earlier. The song was written by Charles McCormick. The B-side "Something's Missing" was written by Charles Love.

Chart performance

References

1975 songs
Song recordings produced by Pip Williams
Song recordings produced by Mike Vernon (record producer)